Complete results for Men's Super-G competition at the 2011 World Championships. It ran on February 9 at 11:00 local time, the second race of the championships. 73 athletes from 30 countries competed.

Results

References

Super-G, men'